Trevor Kirkland (born 1958) was a member of the Democratic Unionist Party (DUP); he left when the power sharing executive began. He served as a member of Newtownabbey Borough Council and later sat for South Antrim in the Northern Ireland Forum.

He is presently pastor of the congregation of the Free Church of Scotland (Continuing) which meets in Doagh.

References 

1958 births
Living people
Members of Newtownabbey Borough Council
Democratic Unionist Party politicians
Members of the Northern Ireland Forum